Guðmundur Jóhannsson (born 19 February 1963) is an Icelandic alpine skier. He competed in two events at the 1984 Winter Olympics.

References

1963 births
Living people
Guðmundur Jóhannsson
Guðmundur Jóhannsson
Alpine skiers at the 1984 Winter Olympics
Guðmundur Jóhannsson
20th-century Icelandic people